Nîmes Cathedral is a Roman Catholic church in Nîmes, France. The cathedral is dedicated to the Blessed Virgin Mary and to the local Saint Castor of Apt.

The cathedral was the seat of the Bishops of Nîmes until 1877, when the name of the diocese was changed. It is still the seat of their successors the Bishops of Nîmes (–Uzès and Alès).

The cathedral is believed to stand on the site of the former temple of Augustus. It is partly Romanesque and partly Gothic in style.

Sources
 Catholic Hierarchy: Diocese of Nîmes

External links

 Nimausenis.com: History of the cathedral, with photos and additional links 
 Photo of the cathedral
 Portal for The Regordane Way (in English and French)

Roman Catholic cathedrals in France
Basilica churches in France
Churches in Gard
Buildings and structures in Nîmes
Tourist attractions in Nîmes